And Their Children After Them, written by Dale Maharidge, photographed by Michael Williamson, and published by Pantheon Books in 1989, won the 1990 Pulitzer Prize for General Non-Fiction. An updated 30th anniversary edition was published by Seven Stories Press in 2019. It is about sharecropper families during the Great Depression.

References

External links

1989 non-fiction books
American history books
Non-fiction books about the Great Depression
Pulitzer Prize for General Non-Fiction-winning works
Pantheon Books books